Petr Šimerka (born 22 November 1948) is a Czech politician. He was the Minister of Labour and Social Affairs  in the caretaker government of Jan Fischer.

References

1948 births
Living people
Politicians from Prague
Labour and Social Affairs ministers of the Czech Republic
Czech Social Democratic Party Government ministers
Charles University alumni